El Horno Creek or Horno Creek (Spanish: "Oven Creek") is a tributary stream of San Juan Creek in Orange County in the U.S. state of California. The creek joins San Juan Creek on the right bank, only a few hundred yards upstream of the Trabuco Creek confluence, within the city limits of San Juan Capistrano.

The creek begins in the foothills of the Santa Ana Mountains, in the mostly residential CDP of Ladera Ranch. The headwaters of the creek were formerly divided into two canyons, but during the development of Ladera Ranch starting in the late 1990s the area was regraded, and the headwaters combined into a single  channel. The creek flows southwest through a small flood control dam and into San Juan Capistrano, where it crosses under Interstate 5 and turns south, bisecting San Juan Elementary School.

Although significant stretches of the creek remain above ground, riparian habitat along the creek remains "sporadic" despite its perennial flow mainly due to pollution from stormwater.

References

Orange County, California articles needing infoboxes
Rivers of Orange County, California
San Juan Creek
Rivers of Southern California